The 2014–15 Women's EHF Champions League was the 22nd edition of the Women's EHF Champions League, the competition for top women's clubs of Europe, organized and supervised by the European Handball Federation.

Budućnost won the title for the second time by defeating Larvik HK 26–22 in the big final.

Overview

Team allocation
League positions of the previous season shown in parentheses (TH: Title holders). 14 teams were directly qualified for the group stage.

Round and draw dates
All draws held at the European Handball Federation headquarters in Vienna, Austria.

Qualification stage

Eight teams took part in the qualification tournaments. They were drawn into two groups of four teams, where they played a semifinal and a final or third place match. The winners of the qualification tournaments, played on 20–21 September 2014, qualified for the group stage. The draw took place on 26 June 2014, at 14:00 local time, in Vienna, Austria.

Seedings
The seedings were published on 23 June 2014.

Qualification tournament 1

Qualification tournament 2

Group stage

The 16 teams were drawn into four groups of four teams, where they played each other twice. The top three teams advanced to the main round. The draw took place on 27 June 2014, at 18:00 local time, in Vienna, Austria.

Seedings
The seedings were published on 23 June 2014.

Group A

Group B

Group C

Group D

Main round

The top three teams of each group from the group stage advanced to the main round. The 12 teams were split into two groups of six teams. The top four placed teams advanced to the knockout stage. The points gained in the group stage against teams that advance, were carried over.

Group 1

Group 2

Knockout stage

The top four placed teams of each group advance to the knockout stage. In the quarterfinals, the teams will play a home-and away series to determine the four participants of the final four, which then determines the winner.

Quarterfinals
The matches were played on 4–5 April and 11–12 April 2015.

|}

Final four
The draw was held on 14 April 2015.

The final four was played in the László Papp Sports Arena, Budapest, Hungary.

Statistics and awards

Top goalscorers
Statistics exclude qualifying rounds and play-off round.

All-Star Team
The all-star team and awards were announced on 8 May 2015.

Goalkeeper: 
Right wing: 
Right back: 
Central back: 
Left back: 
Left wing: 
Pivot:

Other awards
Most Valuable Player of the Final Four: 
Best Coach: 
Best Young Player: 
Best Defence Player:

See also
2014–15 Women's EHF Cup Winners' Cup
2014–15 Women's EHF Cup
2014–15 Women's EHF Challenge Cup

References

External links
Official website

 
Women's EHF Champions League
EHF
EHF